The Silver Dollar Room was a live music venue located next to the main floor of the Hotel Waverly, a four-storey low-rise hotel located in downtown Toronto. Opened in 1900, the hotel was built for J.J. Powell. It was one of the oldest Toronto hotels in continuous operation.

The Room opened on January 5, 1959; it first started as a lounge for the Waverley Hotel and received Heritage Designation Status in 2015 after a proposal to demolish the hotel and the venue was rejected by the City of Toronto.

The Room closed on May 1, 2017. While the site will be redeveloped as a 15-storey mixed-use building, the Silver Dollar will reopen with its distinctive exterior sign and the internal mural reinstated. The building was demolished in 2018.

References

Music venues in Toronto
1958 establishments in Ontario
Demolished buildings and structures in Toronto
Buildings and structures demolished in 2018